The following is a list of governors of Dutch Ceylon. The Dutch arrived on the island of Ceylon on 2 May 1639. Parts of the island were incorporated as a colony administrated by the Dutch East India Company on 12 May 1656. The first governor, Willem Jacobszoon Coster, was appointed on 13 March 1640.

List of governors

See also 
 List of Governors of Portuguese Ceylon (1594–1698)

Sources 
 

17th-century establishments in Sri Lanka
18th-century disestablishments in Sri Lanka
1640 establishments in Asia
1794 disestablishments in Asia
Dutch Empire-related lists
 
Lists of Dutch colonial governors and administrators
Lists of governors
Lists of office-holders in Sri Lanka